1. Fußball-Club Nürnberg Verein für Leibesübungen e. V., often called 1. FC Nürnberg or simply Nürnberg, is a German association football club in Nuremberg, Bavaria, who currently compete in the 2. Bundesliga. Founded in 1900, the club initially competed in the Southern German championship, winning their first title in 1916. Their first German championship was won in 1920. Before the inauguration of the Bundesliga in 1963, 1.FCN won a further 11 regional championships, including the Oberliga Süd formed in 1945, and were German champions another seven times. The club has won the Bundesliga once and the DFB-Pokal four times.

Since 1963, the club has played their home games at the Max-Morlock-Stadion in Nuremberg. Today's club has sections for boxing, handball, hockey (inline skater hockey and ice hockey), rollerblading and ice skating, swimming, skiing, and tennis.

Nürnberg have been relegated from the German football league system top tier Bundesliga on nine occasions – beating the record earlier set by Arminia Bielefeld.

History

Rise of "Der Club"

1. FC Nürnberg was founded on 4 May 1900 by a group of 18 young men who had gathered at local pub Burenhütte to assemble a side committed to playing football rather than rugby, one of the other new "English" games becoming popular at the time. By 1909, the team was playing well enough to lay claim to the South German championship. After World War I, Nürnberg would gradually turn their success into the dominance of the country's football. In the period from July 1918 to February 1922, the team would go unbeaten in 104 official matches. As early as 1919, they came to be referred to simply as "Der Club" in recognition of their skill and of their style on and off the field and would go on to become one of the nation's most widely recognized and popular teams.

Nürnberg faced SpVgg Fürth in the first national championship held after the end of World War I, beating the defending champions 2–0. That would be the first of five titles Der Club would capture over the course of eight years. In each of those wins, they would shutout their opponents.

The 1922 final was contested by Nürnberg and Hamburger SV but never reached a conclusion on the pitch. The match was called on account of darkness after three hours and ten minutes of play, drawn at 2–2. The re-match also went into extra time, and in an era that did not allow for substitutions, that game was called at 1–1 when Nürnberg was reduced to just seven players and the referee ruled incorrectly the club could not continue. Considerable wrangling ensued over the decision. The German Football Association (DFB) awarded the win to Hamburger SV under the condition that they renounce the title in the name of "good sportsmanship" – which the side grudgingly did. Ultimately, the Viktoria trophy was not officially presented that year.

After the glory years
1. FCN's dominance was already beginning to fade when they captured their final trophy of the era in 1927 as the game began to evolve into a more quickly paced contest which did not suit their slower, more deliberate approach. While they continued to field strong sides, other clubs rose to the forefront of German football. In 1934, they lost in the final to Schalke 04, a club that would go on to become the strongest side in the era of football in Nazi Germany. Nürnberg would capture national titles just before and after World War II in 1936 and 1948 in the first post-war national final, and would also take the Tschammerpokal, the forerunner of today's DFB-Pokal, in 1935 and 1939.

Into the modern era

The post-war period began with the club being integrated into the Oberliga Süd, one of the five top divisions in West-Germany at the time. Nürnberg managed to win this league six times until 1963, winning the national championship in 1948. In 1961, 1. FCN captured their eighth national title and appeared in a losing effort in the following year's final. Some consolation was to be had in the team capturing its second DFB-Pokal in 1962. The club's strong play made it an obvious choice to be amongst the 16 teams selected to participate in the Bundesliga, Germany's new professional football league, formed in 1963. Der Club played as a mid-table side through the league's early years until putting on a dominating performance in 1968 in which it sat atop the league table from the fifth week of play on to the end of the season, en route to its first Bundesliga title. It went on to become the first club to be relegated from the Bundesliga as the reigning champions. This was a result of Max Merkel's decision to remove his championship-winning team of veterans – believing that they were too old – in favour of a dozen newcomers.

It would take the club nine years to recover and return from an exile in the second tier, first the Regionalliga Süd, then the 2. Bundesliga Süd, that included several failed efforts in the promotion rounds. 1. FCN returned to the Bundesliga for a year in 1978, but played to a 17th-place finish and were relegated again. The club immediately played its way back to the top flight, but since then its Bundesliga performances have been stumbling ones, characterized by finishes well down the league table and occasional relegation for a season or two. The side's best recent result was a fifth-place finish in 1988.

The early 1980s also saw the rise of a longstanding and intense friendship between the fans of Nürnberg and those of former archrival Schalke 04. Fans accompany each other's on their respective away games, and the two-season matches between the teams are generally a very laid-back and hospitable affair for all fans involved.

In the mid-1990s, Nürnberg had financial problems, including the conviction of their club treasurer Ingo Böbel for fraud and misallocating club finances. This led to their being penalized six points in the 1995–96 season while playing in the 2. Bundesliga. The club was relegated to the third division as a consequence. Improved management saw the club clawing back and return to the top flight eventually.

In 1999, however, 1. FCN suffered what was arguably the worst meltdown in Bundesliga history. Going into the last game of the season, the club sat in 12th place, three points and five goals ahead of Eintracht Frankfurt, which was sitting in 16th place and seemingly headed to relegation. Nürnberg was closing out the season with what looked to be an easy home game against SC Freiburg, which was also facing relegation. Frankfurt was up against 1. FC Kaiserslautern, last season's champions which were in a fight for a UEFA Champions League spot. Therefore, FCN had already begun soliciting season tickets for next Bundesliga season in a letter to current season ticket holders within celebrating successfully avoiding relegation.

The stage was set for an improbable outcome. Nürnberg lost 1–2 with Frank Baumann missing a chance to score in the last minute. Every other 1. FCN rival won, including Frankfurt, which routed Kaiserslautern 5–1 with three late tallies – this put the side ahead on goals scored and sent 1. FCN crashing to 16th place and into a shock relegation. 1. FCN was not relegated because they had fewer points than Frankfurt, nor because of a lower goal differential, but on the third tie-breaker – fewer goals scored.

1. FCN rebounded and played in the Bundesliga but still found itself flirting with relegation from season to season. However, it had comfortably avoided relegation in the 2005–06 season, finishing eighth in the Bundesliga. After several years of consolidation, Nürnberg seemed back as a force to reckon with in Bundesliga football. Manager Martin Bader's professional and sometimes even spectacular work until spring 2007 (the signing of former Ajax captain and Czech international Tomáš Galásek, for example, was greeted with enthusiasm), as well head coach Hans Meyer's tactically modern understanding of football, helped Nürnberg to its most successful play in almost 40 years. In May 2007, the cut for the UEFA Cup was sure and after the triumph over Eintracht Frankfurt in the DFB-Pokal, the Club was in the final of that tournament for the first time since 1982. On 26 May, the Club won this final against VfB Stuttgart in extra time 3–2, winning the DFB-Pokal again 45 years after the last victory.

In the first round of 2007–08, however, the team could convince no more in Bundesliga. As the team had ended up second in their UEFA Cup group in front of later champion Zenit Saint Petersburg after defeating Rapid București in the first round, head coach Hans Meyer was allowed to restructure the team, for example by buying Czech international striker Jan Koller from Monaco. In the consequence of no improvement, Meyer was replaced by Thomas von Heesen after two legs in the second round. The latter one did not do much better, and so 1. FCN was relegated after finishing 16th after losing a 2–0 home match against Schalke 04 on the final matchday. After not meeting the expectations of dominating the 2. Bundesliga, Von Heesen resigned in August and was replaced by his assistant coach, Michael Oenning. After a slow start, Oenning was able to guide Nürnberg to a third-place finish and a playoff with 16th placed Energie Cottbus. Nürnberg won the playoff 5–0 on aggregate, rejoining the Bundesliga. The club was demoted again, however, after the 2013–14 season, finishing 17th with a final matchday loss to Schalke 04. The club finished third in the 2015–16 season and qualified for the promotion play-off to the Bundesliga, but lost on aggregate to Eintracht Frankfurt to remain in the 2. Bundesliga for 2016–17. The club went on to finish 2nd in 2017–2018 season, securing a promotion spot into the Bundesliga with an away win against SV Sandhausen. However, they finished dead last the next season and were relegated back to 2. Bundesliga.

In the 2019–20 2. Bundesliga season, they finished in 16th place, and faced a relegation playoff against 3. Liga side Ingolstadt, for which Nürnberg prevailed and retained its second tier status after winning 3–3 on aggregate score thanks to the away goals rule. The away goal which retained their second-tier status was scored in the sixth minute of injury time in the second leg, thereby keeping them up at the last moment.

Rivals

SpVgg Greuther Fürth is 1. FCN's longest standing local rival. The rivalry dates back to the early days of German football when, at times, those two clubs dominated the national championship. The clubs have played 258 matches against one another, the most in German professional football. In 1921, the Germany national team consisted only of players from Nürnberg and Fürth for a match against the Netherlands in Amsterdam. The players traveled in the same train, but with the Nürnberg players in a carriage at the front of the train and those from Fürth in a carriage at the rear, while team manager Georg B. Blaschke sat in the middle. A Fürth player scored the first goal of the match but was only congratulated by Fürth players. Allegedly, Hans Sutor, a former Fürth player, was forced to leave the team when he married a woman from Nuremberg. He was later signed by 1. FC Nürnberg and was in the team that eventually won three national championships. Both clubs played together in the Bundesliga in 2012–13.

Games against Bayern Munich are usually the biggest events of the season, as the two clubs are the most successful in Bavaria and Germany overall.

Reserve team

The 1. FC Nürnberg II (or 1. FC Nürnberg Amateure) qualified for the Regionalliga Süd on the strength of a third place in the Bayernliga (IV) in 2007–08. The team had been playing in the Bayernlig since 1998, finishing runners-up three times in those years. When not playing in the Bayernlig, the team used to belong to the Landesliga Bayern-Mitte. Nowadays, it plays in tier four Regionalliga Bayern.

League results

Recent seasons
The recent season-by-season performance of the club:

Key

All time

; ; .

Honours
Der Club boasted the title of Deutscher Rekordmeister as holder of the most championships for over 60 years (although occasionally having to share the honour with Schalke 04) before being overtaken by Bayern Munich in 1987.

Germany honours its Bundesliga champions by allowing them to display the gold stars of the "Verdiente Meistervereine" – one star for three titles, two stars for five and three stars for ten. However, currently, only titles earned since 1963 in the Bundesliga are officially recognized. Despite winning the national title nine times, Nürnberg – the country's second-most successful side – is not entitled to sport any championship stars.

League
German Football Championship/Bundesliga
 Champions: 1920, 1921, 1924, 1925, 1927, 1936, 1948, 1961, 1967–68
 Runners-up: 1934, 1937, 1961–62
2. Bundesliga/2. Bundesliga Süd
Champions: 1980, 1985, 2001, 2004

Cup
DFB-Pokal
Winners: 1935, 1939, 1961–62, 2006–07
Runners-up: 1940, 1981–82

European competitions
European Cup
Quarter-finals: 1961–62, 1968-69
European Cup Winners' Cup
Semi-finals: 1962–63

Regional
Süddeutsche Meisterschaft
 Champions: 1916, 1918, 1920, 1921, 1924, 1927, 1929
Ostkreis-Liga
Champions: 1916, 1918
Kreisliga Nordbayern
Champions: 1920, 1921
Bezirksliga Bayern
 Champions: 1924, 1925, 1927
Bezirksliga Nordbayern
Champions: 1929, 1932, 1933
Gauliga Bayern 
Champions: 1934, 1936, 1937, 1938, 1940
Oberliga Süd
Champions: 1947, 1948, 1951, 1957, 1961, 1962
Regionalliga Süd (II)
Champions: 1971
Southern German Cup
Winners: 1919, 1924

Stadium

"Der Club" plays in the communally-owned Max-Morlock-Stadion. It has been the club's home since 1963, and currently has a capacity of 50,000 spectators following the stadium's most recent expansion during the winter break of the 2009–10 season. The club previously played its matches at the Zabo (an abbreviation of Zerzabelshof, the district in which the ground was located).

The stadium was built in 1928 and was known as Stadion der Hitler-Jugend from 1933 to 1945. Originally having a capacity of 40,000 spectators, it was expanded in 1965 to hold 65,000 and subsequently hosted the 1967 Cup Winners' Cup final between Bayern Munich and Rangers, won 1–0 by the German side. The facility was refurbished for the 1974 FIFA World Cup and another recently completed renovation allowed it to seat 45,000 for four preliminary round matches and one Round of 16 contest of the 2006 World Cup.

The Frankenstadion since 2012 bears the commercial name "Grundig Stadion" under an arrangement with a local company. The majority of the fans was in favour of renaming it after club legend Max Morlock. Morlock's name was finally used in 2017.

The club is currently discussing the possibility of building a new stadium, which is to be completed by 2020. A feasibility study has been commissioned and contact has already been made with potential partners. A new stadium is to be made a pure football stadium. It will be built on the site of Frankenstadion and hold a capacity of 50,000 spectators. However, the club has not yet announced any official plans for a new stadium.

Kits

Players

Current squad

Out on loan

1. FC Nürnberg II squad

Notable former players

Greatest ever team
In the summer of 2010, as part of the club's celebration of its 110th anniversary, Nürnberg fans voted for the best players in the club's history. The players who received the most votes in each position were named in the club's greatest ever team.

 Andreas Köpke
 Ferdinand Wenauer
 Thomas Brunner
 Andreas Wolf
 Stefan Reuter
 Hans Dorfner
 Reinhold Hintermaier
 Marek Mintál
 Max Morlock
 Saša Ćirić
 Dieter Eckstein

Reserves: Hans Kalb, Stefan Kießling, Horst Leupold, Dieter Nüssing, Marc Oechler, Luitpold Popp, Raphael Schäfer, Heinz Strehl, Heinrich Stuhlfauth, Horst Weyerich, Sergio Zárate

Records

Numbers in brackets indicate appearances made.

Staff

Coaches and chairmen

Coaches
Outstanding coaches of the earlier years include Izidor "Dori" Kürschner (1921, 1922), Fred Spiksley (1913, 1920s), former player Alfred Schaffer (1930s), Dr. Karl Michalke (1930s), Alwin "Alv" Riemke (1940s–1950s) and former player Hans "Bumbes" Schmidt (1940s, 1950s), who notably did not win a single of his four German Championship titles as coach with Nürnberg, but three of them with the long-standing main rivals Schalke 04. He was also four times champion as player, thereof three times with the Club, and once with the earlier archrival SpVgg Greuther Fürth.

Managerial history (Bundesliga era)

Chairmen

 1900–1904 Christoph Heinz
 1904–1910 Ferdinand Küspert
 1910–1912 Christoph Heinz
 1912–1914 Leopold Neuburger
 1915–1917 Ferdinand Küspert
 1917–1919 Konrad Gerstacker
 1919–1921 Leopold Neuburger
 1921–1923 Ludwig Bäumler
 1923 Eduard Kartini
 1923–1925 Max Oberst
 1926–1930 Hans Schregle
 1930–1935 Ludwig Franz
 1935–1945 Karl Müller
 1945–1946 Hans Hofmann
 1946–1947 Hans Schregle
 1947–1948 Hans Hofmann
 1948–1963 Ludwig Franz
 1963–1964 Karl Müller
 1964–1971 Walter Luther
 1971–1977 Hans Ehrt
 1977–1978 Lothar Schmechtig
 1978–1979 Waldemar Zeitelhack
 1979–1983 Michael A. Roth
 1983–1991 Gerd Schmelzer
 1991–1992 Sven Oberhof
 1992–1994 Gerhard Voack
 1994 Georg Haas
 1994–2009 Michael A. Roth
 2009–2010 Franz Schäfer

Further reading
 Matthias Hunger: Im Bann der Legende. Verlag Schmidt, Neustadt 2010,  (German)
 Matthias Hunger: Fußballkosmos 1. FC Nürnberg. Arete Verlag, Hildesheim 2022,  (German)
 Jon Goulding: For Better or for Wurst. Vanguard Press, 2009,  (English)
 Christoph Bausenwein, Harald Kaiser, Bernd Siegler: Legenden: Die besten Club-Spieler aller Zeiten. Verlag Die Werkstatt, Göttingen 2010,  (German)
 Christoph Bausenwein, Harald Kaiser, Bernd Siegler: Die Legende vom Club. Die Geschichte des 1. FC Nürnberg. Verlag Die Werkstatt, Göttingen 2006,  (German)
 Christoph Bausenwein, Bernd Siegler, Herbert Liedel: Franken am Ball. Geschichte und Geschichten eines Fußballjahrhunderts. Echter Verlag, Würzburg 2003,  (German)
 Christoph Bausenwein, Bernd Siegler: Das Club-Lexikon. Verlag Die Werkstatt, Göttingen 2003,  (German)
 Christoph Bausenwein, Harald Kaiser, Herbert Liedel: 1. FCN, Der Club, 100 Jahre Fussball. Tümmels, Nürnberg 1999,  (German)
 Bernd Siegler: Heulen mit den Wölfen: Der 1. FC Nürnberg und der Ausschluss seiner jüdischen Mitglieder. starfruit publications, Fürth 2022,  (German)

References

External links

 

 
Football clubs in Germany
Football clubs in Bavaria
1. FC Nurnberg
Association football clubs established in 1900
Football in Middle Franconia
Multi-sport clubs in Germany
German handball clubs
1900 establishments in Germany
Bundesliga clubs
2. Bundesliga clubs